Domingos Francisco Dutra Filho (born March 20, 1956) is a Brazilian politician. He was state deputy (1991–1995, 2003–2007), vice-mayor (1997–2000) and federal deputy (1995–2003, 2007–2015). Dutra is a mayor of Paço do Lumiar since 2017.

References 

Workers' Party (Brazil) politicians
Communist Party of Brazil politicians
Living people
1956 births
Maranhão politicians
Brazilian politicians of African descent
Members of the Chamber of Deputies (Brazil) from Maranhão